The Lemmon Petrified Park is a park and museum located off U.S. 12 in Lemmon, South Dakota.  It was listed on the National Register of Historic Places in 1977.

The NRHP nomination describes it:If the traveler crosses the northern plains of South Dakota to the city of Lemmon, he will come upon a very interesting and unusual site—the world's largest petrified wood park. This site consists of 3200 tons of petrified wood, 100 tons of petrified grass, and tons of cannon ball boulders which are either standing in the condition they were found or stacked and cemented together to form conical pyramids, pillars, various other configurations, and three buildings.

The listing included three contributing buildings and a contributing structure.

References

External links

National Register of Historic Places in South Dakota
Buildings and structures completed in 1933
Museums in Perkins County, South Dakota